Sirajul Haque Khan, (1924 – 14 December 1971) born in the district of Noakhali, was a Bengali educationist and martyred intellectual of 1971.

Education
Khan graduated from college in 1949 and obtained an M.Ed. degree from Institute of Education Research (IER), Dhaka University, in 1965. He obtained Ed.D. from the State College of Colorado, United States in 1967 and joined IER, DU as a senior lecturer.

Death and legacy 
On 14 December 1971, a group of Al-Badr members forcibly removed him from his home and murdered him. His body was found in Mirpur, Dhaka. He was buried in Dhaka University Central Mosque. On 14 November 1991, Bangladesh Post Office issued commemorative stamp with his name and picture. On 3 November 2013, two Jamaat leaders, Chowdhury Mueen-Uddin and Ashrafuz Zaman Khan, received a death sentence in absentia for his death.

Gallery

References

1924 births
1971 deaths
University of Dhaka alumni
Academic staff of the University of Dhaka
Bangladeshi murder victims
People killed in the Bangladesh Liberation War